Beaver Mountain is a ski area in the western United States, in northern Utah. First opened  in 1939, it is located near the summit of Logan Canyon in the Bear River Mountains, west of Bear Lake and near the border with Idaho.  While smaller and less developed than a number of Utah ski resorts, Beaver Mountain is very popular with residents of nearby Logan, Utah State University, the surrounding Cache Valley, and the Bear Lake region, including southeastern Idaho.

The slopes of the mountain are predominantly east-facing, and it receives somewhat less snowfall than those resorts facing west. Since it does not currently employ snowmaking equipment, the ski area is entirely dependent upon the (usually) ample natural snowfall, and therefore often opens several weeks later than most other resorts in Utah.  

Garden City, Utah is the closest town, which is about ten to fifteen minutes away.

The ski area is owned and operated by the Seeholzer family: founded by Harry (1902–1968) and succeeded by son  it continues as a family operation under Ted's son Travis.

Facilities 
Facilities at Beaver include a day lodge with grill restaurant, a full-service ski rental operation and a ski shop.  While alpine skiing and snowboarding are the most popular activities, there is a dedicated area for Nordic (cross-country) skiers near the base.

Beaver Mountain also owns a small office near North Logan.

Lifts 
The Little Beaver Lift (a triple chairlift) serves primarily beginner terrain. Originally a double chair, it became a triple in 2011; the new lift adds about 100 yards to the run, by incorporating an area previously served by a rope tow, the other runs originating from the top of the Little Beaver Lift include "Little Beaver," "Tiny Tim," and access to the "Goat Trail" cat track, from which access can be had to the "Beaver Face Lift" and "Harry's Dream Lift," further up the slope.

The Beaver's Face Lift (double) serves only intermediate and advanced runs.  The first chairlift on the mountain, it began operating  in late 1961. It offers access to intermediate and expert terrain.

Harry's Dream Lift (triple) was originally a double chair, installed in the fall of 1969. Already slated for replacement, a failed bearing in March 2006 closed the lift for the balance of the season.  Over that summer and fall, the entire lift was replaced by a more modern triple chair. It unloads near the summit, with fabulous views of the surrounding countryside; all types of terrain served are served, and it also provides the only way to access the base of Marge's Triple Lift (q.v.). The lift is named for founder Harold Seeholzer, who died of cancer in 1968, the year prior to its installation.

Marge's Triple Lift provides access to a half-dozen intermediate and advanced runs, as well as the larger of two terrain parks on the mountain. It can only be accessed by taking the Harry’s Dream Lift. Marge is the daughter-in-law of the founder, married to his second son, Ted. The couple has owned the area since 1997; Ted was previously the general manager and Marge handled ticket sales.

References

External links

 
 Ski Utah.com - Beaver Mountain

Sports venues in Cache County, Utah
Ski areas and resorts in Utah
Event venues established in 1939
1939 establishments in Utah